Getting On may refer to:

Getting On (British TV series), a 2009–12 British television comedy airing on BBC Four
Getting On (American TV series), a 2013–15 American television adaptation of the British series, airing on HBO